Kiesel is a surname. Notable people with the surname include:

 Annemieke Kiesel (born 1979), Dutch female football player
 Bob Kiesel (1911–1993), American sprinter
 Hans Dieter Kiesel, German curler
 Ryan Kiesel (born 1980) American politician
 Brett Keisel (born 1978) American player of American football

German-language surnames